Ewhurst  is a rural village and civil parish in the borough of Waverley in Surrey, England.

The parish includes the smaller hamlets of Ellen's Green and Cox Green near the border with West Sussex. At the north is Hurt Wood, a part of the Surrey Hills AONB. The Greensand Ridge also passes through this area. The rest of the parish, apart from Ewhurst village itself, is classified as an Area of Great Landscape Value (AGLV).

History
Holmbury Hill with its Iron Age settlements in the parishes of Shere, Guildford borough and Abinger, Mole Valley borough Holmbury St Mary for early British settlers would have been a more suitable, accessible settlement than the denser woodland of this area.
 
A Roman road NNW to SSE just west of the village centre runs from Rowhook over the Sussex border where it met with England's south Stane Street (stone street) between London and Chichester the other end point is not clear however it was traced in the reign of Victoria by James Park Harrison (1816–1901) and the Rapley Roman villa's remains are west of the village: interesting discoveries include a tile-kiln discovered and excavated in 1836 and from the villa itself in the 1960s, fragments of a glass goblet and an unusual vase decorated with a 'Mural Crown'.

Richard Rawlinson notes  in 1719 the name Ewehurst appears to have been developed from the wooded hills or hurst and yew due to 

When King John was at Guildford and Knepp Castle in West Sussex on the same day, 21 January 1215, in winter when unmade ways were foul, he very probably used the Roman road.  Historian H. E. Malden commented of the village in 1911, nothing shows the backwardness of the Weald more than the absolute disuse and forgetting (and abandonment) of these lines of through passage. Ewhurst is not named in Domesday. It was part of the great royal manor of Gomshall but was probably sparsely inhabited. That there was some population soon afterwards is implied by Norman work in the church, a chapel to Shere, the earliest evidence of it as a parish was in 1291.

The richness of the Weald's natural resources led it to become an industrial centre of Britain, as both the iron and glass industries needed large amounts of timber for fuel. There is a site of a bloomery iron works at Coneyhurst Gill and glassmaking sites at Ellen's Green and Summersbury/Somersbury. The wealth of the area can also be seen in the many fine timber-framed houses dating from this medieval and Tudor period, however reliance on coal and the work of the industrial revolution later led to neglect, poverty, highwaymen and smuggling exacerbated by the less well trodden transportation connections.

As shown by the list of prominent Victorian and twentieth century figures, the wood nestled physical geography of the area has led to home building among wealthy individuals in the parish.

Significant places

As shown, Ewhurst is a narrow parish.  The northeast of the area includes the large Mullard Space Science Laboratory of UCL formerly Holmbury House laboratory and several sloped copses. Woodland forms a considerable minority of land use also on the wealden clay across the parish such as Upper Canfold Wood (north of Cranleigh Road) and Buildings and Somersbury Woods (north and south of Horsham Road).

There are several of country houses with historically dominant estates, upon which much agriculture and gardening continues; the largest is Baynards Park, which formerly had a Grade II listed country house.

The Church of St Peter and St Paul built in the 12th century – largely rebuilt 1838–39 due to a collapse – apart from the nave, is a Grade I listed building.

Outlying the village, on Pitch Hill, is Marylands a Grade II* listed home by Oliver Hill, constructed in 1929–31 of sandstone with a green Swedish pantiled roof. It was built for M C Warner in a blend of Spanish architecture and Lutyens. It has been used as a film location, including for episodes of Poirot mysteries.

There are a few listed buildings closer to the church including one at Grade II*, White Hart Cottage. The East window behind the altar in the church was commissioned from Archibald Keightley Nicholson as a memorial window for Captain William Ralph Frecheville who was executed after capture 9 January 1920 aged 24, in Rostov-on-Don, Russia, whilst serving as part of the Allied intervention in the Russian Civil War.

There are several businesses in the main village, a village hall for community events and a public houses throughout including The Windmill by Pitch Hill, and at Ellen's Green and Ewhurst Green which is a continuation of the village just south of the main village.

Schools
Hurtwood House residential 16–18, renowned for its theatre and media departments and at £11,725 per term the most expensive school or Higher Education college in the UK  
Ewhurst C of E Infant School

Sport and Leisure
The village's area includes Sayers Croft, a former evacuee centre that is now an outdoor and environmental education centre. The centre has hosted over half a million visitors in its 70-year history.

The village is also home to Hurtwood Polo Club, which aside from polo, holds several music events and shows throughout the year.

Demography and housing

The average level of accommodation in the region composed of detached houses was 28%, the average that was apartments was 22.6%.

The proportion of households in the civil parish who owned their home outright compares to the regional average of 35.1%.  The proportion who owned their home with a loan compares to the regional average of 32.5%.  The remaining % is made up of rented dwellings (plus a negligible % of households living rent-free).

Famous residents

Ewhurst's famous residents include:
Eric Clapton, who is known to play at the Church of England church
Mike Rutherford, founding member of Genesis
Kenney Jones of Small Faces and The Who
Jim Davidson
Gary Brooker, founder of Procol Harum
Diane James MEP for UKIP
Brough Scott
Former residents include: 
 The Honourable Janet Gladys Aitken (1908–1988), socialite, horsebreeder, equestrian, and helicopter pilot
Sir Hugh F. Locke King (1848–1926), Brooklands motor circuit entrepreneur
Sir Henry Doulton (1820–1897), Chevalier of the Légion d'honneur, businessman, inventor and manufacturer of pottery
Sir Dugald Clerk (1854–1932) who designed the world's first successful two-stroke engine
Bernard Bosanquet (1877–1936), cricketer.
Geoffrey Greig (1897–1960), cricketer 
John Evershed (1864–1956), astronomer and discoverer of the Evershed effect.
Mary Ackworth Orr Evershed (1867–1949), astronomer and Dante scholar.
Kenneth Biggs (1911–1998), soldier awarded the George Cross.
Jonathan King, former songwriter and record producer.
Bruce Grobbelaar, former Liverpool FC footballer.
Chapman Pincher, journalist

Notes and references

Notes
  
References

External links

Villages in Surrey
Borough of Waverley
Civil parishes in Surrey